Shiba (Şibeye) is a rural locality (a selo) in Ongudaysky District, the Altai Republic, Russia. The population was 301 as of 2016. There are 3 streets.

Geography 
Shiba is located 34 km northwest of Onguday (the district's administrative centre) by road. Talda is the nearest rural locality.

References 

Rural localities in Ongudaysky District